The seventeenth season of the American reality television show The Voice premiered on September 23, 2019, on NBC.  John Legend, Kelly Clarkson and Blake Shelton returned as coaches for their second, fourth, and seventeenth seasons, respectively. Gwen Stefani, who last coached in the twelfth season in 2017, returned after a four season-hiatus, replacing Adam Levine. With Levine's departure, Shelton serves as the last remaining coach from the show's inaugural season. Meanwhile, Carson Daly returned for his seventeenth season as host.

Jake Hoot was named winner of this season, marking Kelly Clarkson's third win as a coach. Also, Hoot became the second winner in the show’s history to have been a one-chair turn in the Blind Auditions. This is also the last season to date with four finalists compete in the finale.

Dane Mautone of Dane & Stephanie became the American version's second openly transgender contestant (after season 14's Angel Bonilla) and first transgender male.

Coaches and hosts

 
On May 24, 2019, after having initially opted to return for another season, it was announced that original coach Adam Levine wouldn't be returning as a coach and would be departing from the show after sixteen seasons. Gwen Stefani replaced Levine, marking her fourth season as a coach. Blake Shelton returned for his seventeenth season as a coach, John Legend for his second, and Kelly Clarkson for her fourth.

The Knockouts, removed in the sixteenth season in favor of the Live Cross Battles round, returned this season, replacing the latter. This season, the coaches went back to having only one Knockout steal instead of a steal and a save. For the first time, the coaches had one steal and one save in the Battles instead of the usual two steals like in the prior seasons. This is the last season to date to have the iTunes bonus multiplier during the live shows.
 
This season's battle advisors were Normani for Team Kelly, Will.i.am for Team Gwen, Usher for Team Legend, and Darius Rucker for Team Blake.

Taylor Swift served as a “mega-mentor” for all teams during the Knockouts. She had previously mentored in the show's seventh season.

Teams
Color key

Blind auditions
Color key

Episode 1 (September 23)
The coaches are joined by Carson Daly on guitar for an intimate performance of ‘90s hit "More Than Words" to kick off the season.

Episode 2 (September 24)

Episode 3 (September 30)

Episode 4 (October 1)

Episode 5 (October 7)

Episode 6 (October 8)

Episode 7 (October 14)

The Battles 
The second half of "The Voice" episode which aired on October 14 marked the start of the Battle Rounds. The advisors for this round include: Normani for Team Kelly, will.i.am for Team Gwen, Usher for Team Legend, and Darius Rucker for Team Blake. The coaches could steal one losing artist from other coaches and save one losing artist on their team. Artists who won their battle, were saved by their Coach, or were stolen by another coach advanced to the Knockout rounds.

Color key:

The Knockouts
The Knockout round started on October 28 after the final battles. The coaches could each steal one losing artist from another team. The Top 20 contestants then moved on to the Live Playoffs. Taylor Swift was the advisor to contestants from all teams in this round.

Color key:

Live shows
Color key:

Week 1: Live Playoffs (Nov 11 & 12)
The Live Playoffs comprised episodes 15 and 16. For the first time since season 11, there was a Top 20 instead of a Top 24. On Monday, the Top 20 artists performed live for their chance at a spot in the Top 13. On Tuesday, in the live results show, two artists from each team advanced based on America's vote, and each coach got to save one of their own artists. The remaining artists from each team with the highest overnight vote had a chance to compete for the Wild Card similar to season 7 and one artist continued on.

KeIIy Clarkson had four members on her team, for the second time, following the fifteenth season.

Week 2: Top 13 (Nov 18 & 19)
This week's theme was “Dedications.” The three artists with the fewest votes competed for an Instant Save, with two leaving the competition.

This season, same as the last two seasons, the artist who racked up the most streams on Apple Music during the voting window had their Apple Music votes multiplied by 5.

This week, Jake Hoot was the recipient of the Apple Music Multiplier.

With the elimination of Cali Wilson, this marked the first time since the seventh season that Blake Shelton lost any members of his team prior to the top 11, and the second time out of the past seven seasons in which such an event occurred.

Week 3: Top 11 (Nov 25 & 26)
This week's theme was “Fan Week.” The two artists with the fewest votes competed for an Instant Save, with one leaving the competition.

Once again, the Apple Music multiplier was awarded to Jake Hoot.

Week 4: Top 10 (Dec 2 & 3)
This week's theme was “Challenge Week”. The three artists with the fewest votes competed for an Instant Save, with two leaving the competition.

Jake Hoot received the Apple Music multiplier for the third week in a row as he confirmed on Instagram.

For the first time this season, the contestants cracked the Top 10 on iTunes. Jake Hoot hit #4 and Katie Kadan hit #8 at the close of the voting window.

Week 5: Semifinals (Dec 9 & 10)
The Top 8 performed on Monday, December 9, 2019, with the results following on Tuesday, December 10, 2019. Three artists were automatically moved on to the finale. The two artists with the fewest votes were immediately eliminated and the middle three contended for the remaining spot in the next finale via the Instant Save.

In addition to their solo song, each artist performed an 80s duet with another contestant.

This week, three artists reached the top 10 on iTunes. Jake Hoot charted at #1, Ricky Duran peaked at #2 and Rose Short hit #7 at the close of the voting window.

With the elimination of Kat Hammock, this was the first time since the eleventh season that Blake Shelton has not had two or more artists in the finale.  In addition, this was the first time since the tenth season that all four coaches were represented in the finale.

Week 6: Finale (Dec 16 & 17)
The final 4 performed on Monday, December 16, 2019, with the final results following on Tuesday, December 17, 2019. Each finalist performed a solo cover song, a holiday-themed duet with their coach, and an original song.

This week, seven of the eight spots on the top of iTunes chart were occupied by The Voice Top 4 when voting ended (Ricky Duran at #1, Jake Hoot at #3, #5, #6 and Katie Kadan at #4, #7).
Jake Hoot's semi-final performance reached Top 10 on iTunes one more time at #8. Thus, he had six songs in the Top 10 of the iTunes Country Singles chart and four songs in the Top 10 on the Overall Singles chart. This is more than any other singer in the history of the show has had in the Top 10 at one time. Hoot’s duet of “Wintersong” with Clarkson climbed as high as #3 on the iTunes Overall Singles chart, making it the highest-charting coach duet in the history of the show.

Elimination chart

Overall
Color key
Artist's info

Result details

Teams
Color key
Artist's info

Results details

Artists who appeared on other shows or previous seasons
 Jessie Lawrence was on season 12 of American Idol and was eliminated in the Group Round of Hollywood Week.
 Ricky Braddy was on season 8 of American Idol and was eliminated in the Top 17.
 Jordan Chase appeared in season 20 of American Idol and made it to the Showstoppers Round
 Marybeth Byrd will appear on season 21 of American Idol.

Ratings

References

External links

Season 17
2019 American television seasons